Bill & Ted is an American science fiction comedy franchise created by Chris Matheson and Ed Solomon. It features William "Bill" S. Preston Esq. and " Ted" Theodore Logan, portrayed by Alex Winter and Keanu Reeves, respectively, two metalhead slacker friends who travel through time and beyond while trying to fulfill their destiny to establish a utopian society in the universe with their music. The series spans three films: Bill & Ted's Excellent Adventure (1989), Bill & Ted's Bogus Journey (1991), and Bill & Ted Face the Music (2020). The series has been mainly produced by Scott Kroopf.

There have been numerous spin-offs, including an animated television series (with Winter and Reeves reprising their roles), a live-action television series in 1992, video games and comic books. Originally released and co-produced by Orion Pictures, ownership moved to Metro-Goldwyn-Mayer following the purchase of Orion in 1997, and MGM has been the main licensee and distributor since. The series has grossed $85 million and received generally positive reviews from critics.

Setting
The series follows the pair of William "Bill" S. Preston Esq. (Alex Winter) and "Ted" Theodore Logan (Keanu Reeves), initially two idiotic teenagers living in San Dimas, California in 1988. They want to make their rock band "Wyld Stallyns" successful, but their ambitions and lackadaisical attitudes leave them close to flunking out of high school and threatening to split the band up forever. Unbeknownst to them, their music will form the basis of a utopian society in the future. The leaders of this society send Rufus (George Carlin) to help Bill & Ted pass school and assure the future with the aid of a time machine, which appears as a phone booth. Later films focus on attempts by others to break up Bill & Ted so that their music will never lead to a utopian future.

Films

Bill & Ted's Excellent Adventure (1989)

Excellent Adventure introduces Bill and Ted who are trying to write a history report. Rufus, a guide from the year 2688, arrives to provide them the time machine which allows them to travel back in time and meet historical figures in order to learn about key historical events. If Bill and Ted fail to pass, their teacher will have to flunk them and Ted's father will transfer him to an Alaskan military high school, which will lead to Wyld Stallyns never forming, in turn destroying a Utopian future built around their music.

Bill & Ted's Bogus Journey (1991)

In Bogus Journey, Chuck De Nomolos, a resident of the utopia, is sick of it and sends a pair of Bill & Ted robot doubles back into the past to kill Bill and Ted and make a future based on his ideals. Bill & Ted are killed, face the Grim Reaper, and manage to beat him at several games. This gives them the opportunity to find allies to stop their robot doubles and De Nomolos before an upcoming Battle of the Bands where they must also rescue the princesses to whom they are engaged and start their musical careers.

Bill & Ted Face the Music (2020)

Bill and Ted are now middle-aged parents, yet to realize the music that the future Utopian society will follow. They are warned by the Great Leader and Rufus's daughter Kelly from the future that they only have a short time in their present to create the great song or reality will collapse. Bill and Ted decide to travel to their future to try to find their song, but are hunted by a time-travelling robot. Kelly warns their teenage daughters, Billie and Thea, about their plight, and the two go off into the past to help create a band to make the great song for their fathers in time.

Possible fourth film
Shortly before the release of Face the Music, Winter and Reeves discussed the possibility of a fourth Bill & Ted movie, the latter telling Rachel Smith of Entertainment Tonight that it would be "up to the fans". When asked in an interview with DiscussingFilm in August 2020 if the characters of Billie and Thea could result in a sequel or spin-off film, writer Ed Solomon stated, "It wasn't when we were first writing it, but as we saw Brigette and Samara inhabit these roles, I thought for sure if there was interest and people wanted to carry this forward, the Bill & Ted spirit, I would absolutely let those characters carry it forward. I think we've finished with the Alex and Keanu Bill & Ted story. I think it's done, but if people were interested in a Billie & Thea continuation, I think it'd be cool."

Television

Bill & Ted's Excellent Adventures (1990–1991)

The first season was produced by Hanna-Barbera and ran for 13 episodes on CBS in 1990, featured the voices of Carlin, Winter and Reeves returning to their roles in the film. A second season of eight episodes ran on Fox Kids and was produced by DIC Entertainment, with none of the original cast.

Bill & Ted's Excellent Adventures (1992)

A later live-action series, featuring none of the cast from the film, included Christopher Kennedy as Bill and Evan Richards as Ted (who also voiced the same roles in the animated season produced by DIC). This version aired seven episodes in 1992 on Fox. William Sadler additionally reprised his role as the Grim Reaper in "The Assassin", a 1994 episode of Tales from the Crypt.

Cast and crew

Cast
 An  indicates an appearance through previously recorded material.
 A  indicates the actor or actress was uncredited for their role.
 A  indicates a performance through voice-work.
 A  indicates an actor portrayed a younger version of their character.

Note: A gray cell indicates character did not appear in that medium.

Crew

Reception

Box office performance

Critical and public response

Other media

Comics

DC Comics produced a tie-in comic following the plot of the first movie timed to coincide with that film's release on home video. The sequel was adapted by DC's competitor Marvel Comics, published to coincide with the second film's release in theaters. Its popularity led to the ongoing Marvel series Bill & Ted's Excellent Comic Book by Evan Dorkin, which lasted for 12 issues.

There was a weekly 2/4 page semi-adaptation of the animated series published for a year by UK's defunct Look-In Magazine from 1991 to 1992.

In 2015, Boom! Comics revived the franchise in comic form with the six issue miniseries, Bill & Ted's Most Triumphant Return, followed by a trade paperback collection of the Marvel Comics releases, Bill & Ted's Excellent Comic Book: Archive (2016). The success of the miniseries led to two additional miniseries: the four issue Bill & Ted Go to Hell (2016) and the five issue Bill & Ted Save the Universe (2017).

As an official prequel to the third movie, Dark Horse Comics released the four issue miniseries Bill & Ted are Doomed (2020).

Cereal

A cereal based on the animated series adaptation. It was made by the defunct Ralston Purina. It was short-lived, like the cartoon and it included many giveaways and promotions.

Musical

A musical based on the film was produced in 1998 called Bill and Ted's Excellent Musical Adventure.

Video games
There were also Game Boy, NES and Atari Lynx games released, which were very loosely based on the film's plot. A PC title and nearly identical Amiga and Commodore 64 port were made in 1991 by Off the Wall Productions and IntraCorp, Inc. under contract by Capstone Software and followed the original film very closely.

Home computer

A single player graphic adventure PC game based on the 1989 film Bill & Ted's Excellent Adventure. It was released by Capstone for DOS, Commodore 64, and Amiga systems in 1989.

Atari Lynx

A video game for the Atari Lynx handheld based on the Bill & Ted films and the Saturday morning cartoon.

NES

An action-adventure video game based on Bill & Ted's Excellent Adventure that was released in North America by LJN for the Nintendo Entertainment System.

Game Boy

An action-puzzle game loosely based on Bill & Ted's Excellent Adventure.

Mobile
Wyld Stallyns is an action-RPG video game based on the Bill & Ted universe was released by Built Games in 2018 for iOS and Android devices.

Halloween Horror Nights
Bill & Ted also featured in an annual live-action show at Universal Studios Florida and Universal Studios Hollywood during Halloween Horror Nights. Typically the show parodied the past year's worth of notable pop culture events, featuring locally cast performers as the title characters.

In 2013, the Universal Studios Hollywood Bill and Ted's Excellent Halloween Adventure show was cancelled following allegations by Jamie Lee Curtis Taete from Vice of homophobia and racism in that year's show. The show continued at Universal Studios Florida, until 2017.

Notes

References

 
Film series introduced in 1989
Adventure film series
Comedy film series
Metro-Goldwyn-Mayer franchises
Fictional film duos
Science fiction film series